Tuberculocarpus is a genus of plants in the family Asteraceae.

There is only one known species, Tuberculocarpus ruber, endemic to the State of Amazonas in southern Venezuela.

References

Monotypic Asteraceae genera
Endemic flora of Venezuela
Heliantheae